Rhodacaroidea is a superfamily of mites in the order Mesostigmata. There are 6 families with more than 900 described species in Rhodacaroidea, found worldwide.

These mites inhabit soil and litter, including rodent and nests, moss and lichen, termite nests, and sometimes tree trunks. Some are predators of small insects, mites, and springtails, and some have been found on bark beetles.

Families
These six families belong to the superfamily Rhodacaroidea:
 Digamasellidae Evans
 Halolaelapidae Karg, 1965
 Laelaptonyssidae Womersley, 1956
 Ologamasidae Ryke, 1962
 Rhodacaridae Evans, 1957
 Teranyssidae Halliday, 2006

References

Acari
Arthropod superfamilies